The 2016–17 Maryland Terrapins men's basketball team represented the University of Maryland, College Park in the 2016–17 NCAA Division I men's basketball season. They were led by sixth-year head coach Mark Turgeon and played their home games at Xfinity Center in College Park, Maryland as members of the Big Ten Conference.

They finished the season 24–9, 12–6 in Big Ten play to finish in a tie for second place. As the No. 3 seed in the Big Ten tournament, they lost to Northwestern in the quarterfinals. They received an at-large bid to the NCAA tournament. As a No. 6 seed in the West region, they lost in the First Round to Xavier.

Previous season
The Terrapins finished the 2015–16 season with a record of 27–9, 12–6 in Big Ten play to finish in a four-way tie for third place in conference. They defeated Nebraska in the quarterfinals of the Big Ten tournament to advance to the semifinals where they lost to Michigan State. They received an at-large bid to the NCAA tournament where they defeated South Dakota State and Hawaii to advance to the Sweet Sixteen. In the Sweet Sixteen, they lost to Kansas.

Departures

Incoming transfers

2016 Recruiting Class

2017 Recruiting Class

Roster

Depth chart

Schedule and results

|-
!colspan=9 style=| Exhibition

|-
!colspan=12 style=| Non-conference regular season

|-
!colspan=9 style=|Big Ten Regular Season

|-
!colspan=9 style=|Big Ten tournament

|-
!colspan=9 style=|NCAA tournament

Rankings

See also
2016–17 Maryland Terrapins women's basketball team

References

External links
 Official website
 Terps at ESPN

Maryland Terrapins men's basketball seasons
Maryland
Maryland
Terra
Terra